Ingrid Stensrud (born 23 April 1986) is a Norwegian curler.

She was second for the Norwegian team at the 2010 Ford World Women's Curling Championship in Swift Current, Canada.

References

External links
 

Norwegian female curlers
Living people
1986 births